Balm is an unincorporated census-designated place in Hillsborough County, Florida, United States. The population was 1,457 at the 2010 census.

History
A post office was established here in 1902 and called "Doric"; it was renamed the next month to "Balm". The community was so named on account of their "balmy" air. Prior to 1902, the Seaboard Air Line Railway established Balm as a flag stop. The railroad built a one-room station and water tank. This made Balm a focal point, and a small community including a blacksmith, sawmills, a teacher, and a general store sprang up by 1911. In 1937, electricity arrived, soon followed by a community telephone, set up in a barn for all to use. By 1945 the area had a population of over a thousand.

Geography
Balm is located in southern Hillsborough County, bordered by Riverview to the north, Apollo Beach to the west, Sun City Center to the southwest, and Wimauma to the south. U.S. Route 301 forms the western border of the Balm CDP, and leads north  to the eastern outskirts of Tampa and southwest  to Bradenton.

Demographics

Economy
Originally a rail stop and logging town, the economy is mostly agricultural, largely citrus. The University of Florida's Tomato Breeding Program is located in Balm. In 2005, the Bradenton REC was merged with the Dover REC to become the Gulf Coast Research and Experiment Center, which was relocated to Balm. Other activities at the GCREC include hops research. Tropical fish farming has also been a significant industry in the area.

References

External links
Balm community and surrounding area profile
http://www.ghosttowns.com/states/fl/balm.html

Census-designated places in Hillsborough County, Florida
Census-designated places in Florida